The Apostolic Nuncio to Lebanon is a diplomatic post within the Catholic Church. The Apostolic Nuncio represents the pope. The Apostolic Nunciature in Lebanon was established on 21 March 1947 with the For christifidelium salutem by Pope Pius XII.

Apostolic Nuncios to Lebanon

Giuseppe Beltrami (4 October 1950 – 31 January 1959)
Paolo Bertoli (16 April 1959 – 16 April 1960)
Egano Righi-Lambertini (9 July 1960 – 9 December 1963)
Gaetano Alibrandi (9 December 1963 – 19 April 1969)
Alfredo Bruniera (23 April 1969 – 6 November 1978)
Carlo Furno (25 November 1978 – 21 August 1982)
Luciano Angeloni (21 August 1982 – 31 July 1989)
Pablo Puente Buces (31 July 1989 – 31 July 1997)
Antonio Maria Vegliò (2 October 1997 – 11 April 2001)
Luigi Gatti (28 June 2001 – 16 July 2009)
Gabriele Giordano Caccia (16 July 2009 – 12 September 2017) 
Joseph Spiteri (7 March 2018 – 7 July 2022)
Paolo Borgia (24 September 2022 – present)

References

Lebanon
 
Lebanon politics-related lists